This list of egg topics connects to numerous articles about eggs. The wide-ranging diversity of topics here exceeds the scope of any other single article to link all of these articles.

This list of egg topics is not intended to be complete, but it spans the vast majority of related articles. The names of articles were linked from current articles, but those article names might be changed, at a later time.

Also, names might not be the commonly accepted English-language terms for a particular topic. However, with food dishes, non-English names are often adopted into the culture, such as with "Huevos rancheros" as an egg dish found in Tex-Mex cuisine.


Egg terminology or parts

 Egg (biology)
 Egg (food)
 Egg carton
 Egg spoon
 Egg white
 Egg yolk
 Eggshell
 Embryo
 Caviar
 Free-range eggs
 Chick culling
 Organic egg production
 Pasteurized eggs
 Powdered eggs
 Roe
 Separating eggs
 Zygote
Related:
 Candling
 Chalaza (chalazae)
 Haugh unit
 Rompope
 Vitelline membrane (yolk)

Eggs as food dishes

A to Z  egg dishes
 Balut (egg)
 Bai pong moan
 Boiled egg
 Brik
 Century egg
 Changua
 Chinese steamed eggs
 Çılbır
 Coddled egg
 Custard
 Deviled egg
 Devonshire eggs
 Egg bhurji
 Egg drop soup
 Egg foo young
 Egg in the basket
 Egg khagina
 Egg salad
 Egg sandwich
 Eggs Benedict
 Eggs Neptune
 Eggs Sardou
 Eggs and brains
 French toast
 Fried egg
 Fritaja
 Frittata
 Haminados
 Hangtown fry
 Huevos divorciados
 Huevos motuleños
 Huevos rancheros
 Indian Omelette
 Kai yat sai
 Machacado con huevo
 Menemen (food)
 Meringue
 Moo shu pork
 Nasi goreng pattaya
 Omelette
 Omurice
 Oyster omelette
 Panagurska egg
 Pickled egg
 Poached egg
 Quiche
 Salted duck egg
 Scotch egg
 Scotch woodcock
 Scrambled eggs
 Shakshouka
 Shirred eggs
 Soufflé
 Soy egg
 Stratta
 Tamago kake gohan
 Tamagoyaki
 Tea egg
 Tortilla de patatas

Custard dessert topics

 Custard
 Banana pudding
 Bavarian cream
 Bean pie
 Berliner (pastry)
 Bird's Custard
 Bob Andy pie
 Boiled custard
 Boston cream pie
 Bougatsa
 Bread and butter pudding
 Buttermilk pie
 Charlotte (dessert)
 Charlotte Russe
 Cheesecake
 Clafoutis
 Cocktail bun
 Cream pie
 Crème anglaise
 Crème brûlée
 Crème caramel
 Custard pie
 Custard tart
 Éclair (pastry)
 Egg tart
 Flapper pie
 Floating island (dessert)
 Flourless chocolate cake
 Frangipane
 Frozen custard
 Galaktoboureko
 Kissel
 Kogel mogel
 Krafne
 Kremna rezina
 Malvern pudding
 Manchester tart
 Melktert
 Mille-feuille
 Nanaimo bar
 Natillas
 Neenish tart
 Norman Tart
 Pączki
 Pastel de nata
 Pio Quinto
 Pot de creme
 Profiterole
 Pumpkin pie
 Queen of Puddings
 Quindim
 Rožata
 Skolebrød
 Soufflé
 St. Honoré Cake
 Sufganiyah
 Sweet potato pie
 Tiramisu
 Trifle
 Vla
 Watalappam
 Zabaglione
 Zeppole
 Zuppa Inglese

Eggs in culture

 Chicken or the egg
 Instagram egg
 Easter egg
 Egg collecting
 Egg dance
 Egg decorating
 Egg decorating in Slavic culture
 Egg drop competition
 Egg hunt
 Egg of Columbus
 Egg of Li Chun
 Egg rolling
 Egg tapping
 Egg-jarping
 Egging
 Egyptian egg oven
 Golden egg
 Humpty Dumpty
 L’eggs
Marc Andreessen
 Pace Egg play
 Pisanica (Croatian)
 Pisanka (Polish)
 Pysanka
 Pysanka Museum
 Tempera
 The Enormous Egg

Fabergé egg topics

 Fabergé egg (overview)
 Alexander III Commemorative (Fabergé egg)
 Alexander III Equestrian (Fabergé egg)
 Alexander III Portraits (Fabergé egg)
 Alexander Palace (Fabergé egg)
 Basket of Wild Flowers (Fabergé egg)
 Bay Tree (Fabergé egg)
 Blue Serpent Clock Egg
 Bouquet of Lilies Clock (Fabergé egg)
 Caucasus (Fabergé egg)
 Cherub with Chariot Egg
 Clover Leaf (Fabergé egg)
 Colonnade (Fabergé egg)
 Constellation (Fabergé egg)
 Czarevich (Fabergé egg)
 Danish Palaces Egg
 Diamond Trellis Egg
 Duchess of Marlborough Egg
 Empire Nephrite (Fabergé egg)
 First Hen Egg
 Gatchina Palace (Fabergé egg)
 Gorbachev Peace Egg
 Hen with Sapphire Pendant
 Imperial Coronation Egg
 Karelian Birch (Fabergé egg)
 Kelch Chanticleer (Fabergé egg)
 Lilies of the Valley
 Mauve (Fabergé egg)
 Memory of Azov Egg
 Mosaic (Fabergé egg)
 Moscow Kremlin (Fabergé egg)
 Napoleonic (Fabergé egg)
 Nobel Ice (Fabergé egg)
 Nécessaire Egg
 Order of St. George (Fabergé egg)
 Peacock (Fabergé egg)
 Pelican (Fabergé egg)
 Peter the Great (Fabergé egg)
 Pine Cone (Fabergé egg)
 Red Cross with Imperial Portraits
 Red Cross with Triptych (Fabergé egg)
 Renaissance (Fabergé egg)
 Resurrection Egg
 Revolving Miniatures Egg
 Romanov Tercentenary (Fabergé egg)
 Rose Trellis (Fabergé egg)
 Rosebud (Fabergé egg)
 Rothschild (Fabergé egg)
 Royal Danish (Fabergé egg)
 Scandinavian (Fabergé egg)
 Standart Yacht (Fabergé egg)
 Steel Military (Fabergé egg)
 Swan (Fabergé egg)
 Trans-Siberian Railway (Fabergé egg)
 Twelve Monograms (Fabergé egg)
 Twelve Panel (Fabergé egg)
 Winter (Fabergé egg)

Egg diseases
 Salmonella enteritidis
 Egg allergy (food allergy)

Oology topics

 Oology
 Chalaza
 Bird egg
 Clutch (eggs)
 Egg (biology)
 Egg tossing (behavior)
 Germinal disc
 Jourdain Society
 Ootheca
 Ornithology
 Oviparity
 Palaeooölogy
 Trophic egg

See also

 List of chicken breeds
 Category: Egg dishes

Notes

ZZ
ZZ
Eggs